Dahaneh (Qaryah-ye Dahaneh, Qaryah-ye Dahānah) is a town in Helmand Province, Afghanistan. It is located at a crossroads and has a population of about 2,000 (2009 estimate). It was the site of the Battle of Dahaneh, 12 August to 15 August 2009, between Taliban insurgents and elements of the Afghan National Army and the United States Marines.

See also
 Helmand Province

Notes

Populated places in Helmand Province